The Himalayan bulbul (Pycnonotus leucogenys), or white-cheeked bulbul, is a species of songbird in the bulbul family found in Central and South Asia.

Taxonomy and systematics
The Himalayan bulbul is considered to belong to a superspecies along with the white-eared bulbul, white-spectacled bulbul, African red-eyed bulbul, Cape bulbul, and common bulbul. The alternate name, white-cheeked bulbul, is also used by the white-eared bulbul.

Description
The Himalayan bulbul is about 18 cm in length, with a wingspan of 25.5–28 cm and an average weight of 30 g. Its head, throat, and crest are black and white. The back, side, and lengthy tail are brown, the underside is pale yellow. Sexes have similar plumage. The song is a beautiful 4-piece whistle, which resembles an accelerated oriole whistle.

Distribution and habitat
The species occurs in the northern regions of the Indian subcontinent and some adjoining areas. It is found in and near the Himalayas.

The Himalayan bulbul frequents forests and shrubland and also comes into gardens and parks.

Behaviour and ecology
The Himalayan bulbul feeds on insects and other small invertebrates, as well as berries, fruits, seeds, buds and nectar.

Nests are usually built in bushes or low branches, are cup-shaped, and made of stems, roots and twigs. The female usually lays three eggs, which are incubated for 12 days. The chicks leave the nest when they are 9–11 days old. There may be up to three broods raised per year. During breeding, adults become very territorial.

Gallery

References

Himalayan bulbul
Birds of the Himalayas
Birds of North India
Himalayan bulbul
Himalayan bulbul
Taxonomy articles created by Polbot